Charles Hodgson Lindsey was a British computer scientist, most known for his involvement with the programming language ALGOL 68.

He was an editor of the Revised Report on Algol 68, and co-wrote a ground breaking book on the language An Informal Introduction to Algol 68, which was unusual because it was written so that it could be read horizontally (i.e., serially, in the normal manner) or vertically (i.e., starting with section 1.1, then 2.1, then 3.1, etc., before going back to section 1.2, then 2.2, and so on) depending on how a reader wanted to learn the language.

He was responsible for the research implementation of ALGOL 68 for the experimental MU5 computer at Manchester University, and maintained an implementation of a subset named ALGOL 68S.

He wrote the complete History of ALGOL 68 in:

He was involved with developing international standards in programming and informatics, as a member of the International Federation for Information Processing (IFIP) IFIP Working Group 2.1 on Algorithmic Languages and Calculi, which specified, maintains, and supports the programming languages ALGOL 60 and ALGOL 68.

He was a member of the Computer Conservation Society, North West Branch, and part of the team restoring Douglas Hartree's Differential Analyser at Manchester Museum of Science and Technology.

References

External links 

British computer scientists